Neyab is the name of the following villages in Iran:
 Neyab, North Khorasan
 Neyab, South Khorasan

See also
 Neyab-e Ab Kenaru, Kohgiluyeh and Boyer-Ahmad Province, Iran, a village